Jintang Island (金塘岛) is an island in the Zhoushan prefecture-level city in China's eastern Zhejiang province. It has a population of about 41700.

History 

The name Jintang Island is literally translated as "Golden Pond Island".

It derived its name from the two ponds built on the western side of the island by the locals to prevent erosion of the western coastline. The soil of the inner pond coastline became fertile and rich in minerals, bringing about bountiful harvests to the locals who dub the island "Golden Pond" (金塘).

Industries 

Jintang Island is largely an agricultural community. Its thriving industries include farming, fishing and furniture production.

It is most famous for the production of Jintang Plums (金塘李), a local fruit. The fruit has received a number of awards and accolades, earning a Zhejiang Province High Quality Agricultural Product Exhibition Silver Award in 1998 and subsequently a Gold Award in 1999 when the island was also conferred the namesake of "Jintang Plum Township (金塘李之乡)" by the provincial government.

Jintang Island coastal waters produce a large number of marine products, such as squid, cuttlefish, fish, and more.

Transportation 

Transport between Jintang and Zhoushan is made by boat.

In April 2006 work began for the construction of two bridges, the Xihoumen Bridge (西堠门大桥) and Jintang Bridge (金塘大桥) connecting Zhoushan Archipelago with the country's continental area, an improvement long-awaited by Zhoushan people. They are scheduled to be completed in 2008.

The two bridges are the second phase of a huge "continent-island joint project" launched by Zhoushan in 1999 to link the archipelago with the mainland through five bridges. Construction of the other three bridges have been completed.

Xihoumen Bridge 

The 5.3-kilometer-long Xihoumen Bridge, linking Jintang and Cezi, two major islands of the archipelago, is a suspension bridge consisting of a 2.6-kilometer sea-crossing bridge and 2.7-kilometer side joint sections on both ends, costing 2.48 billion yuan (US$299.87 million). It allows the passage of ships of 30,000 dead weight tonnage.

Jintang Bridge
The 7-billion-yuan project consists of an  sea bridge and joint sections totaling .

On 27 March 2008, there has been an accident involving a Taizhou freighter that hit the bridge construction site. Two pieces of reinforced concrete from the bridge weighing 3000 tons each got stuck in the cockpit of the freighter, which was moving at a fast pace. The accident will result in further delay to the completion of its construction.

There are plans by a Sino-Italian consortium to build an archimedes bridge in the  Jintang strait.

Ningbo Ports Group is also planning to build a proposed 12 container berths worth 10 billion yuan (US$1.25billion) in future at Jintang Island in anticipation of fierce competition from Shanghai's Yangshan Deep-Water Port.

References

External links
 JinTangDao , Jintang Island discussion forum 

Zhoushan